List of rivers in Tocantins (Brazilian State).

The list is arranged by drainage basin, with respective tributaries indented under each larger stream's name and ordered from downstream to upstream. The Tocantins state is located entirely within the Tocantins drainage basin.

By Drainage Basin 

 Tocantins River
 Araguaia River
 Piranhas River (lower)
 Lontra River
 Muricizal River
 Das Cunhãs River
 Juari River
 Barreiros River
 Bananal River
 Piranhas River (upper)
 Caiapó River
 Caiapozinho River
 Do Coco River
 Braço Menor do Rio Araguaia River (Javaés River)
 Lever River (Itaberaí River)
 Pium River
 Riozinho River
 Formoso River (Cristalino River)
 Urubu Grande River (Das Pedras River)
 Dueré River
 Xavante River
 Piaus River
 Escuro River
 Pau-Seco River
 Riozinho River
 Rondi Toró River
 Jaburu River
 Imuti River
 Do Fogo River
 Água Fria River
 Verde River
 Tiúba River
 Cana Brava River
 Grotão das Arraias River
 Manuel Alves Grande River
 Vermelho River
 Bonito River
 Manuel Alves Pequeno River
 Capivara River
 Água Fria River
 Do Sono River
 Soninho River
 Novo River
 Perdida River
 Negro River
 Da Prata River
 Vermelho River
 Das Balsas River
 Fumaça River
 Espingarda River
 Caracol River
 Lajeado River
 Dos Mangues River
 Areias River
 Crixás River
 Formiga River
 Manuel Alves da Natividade River
 Bagagem River
 São Valério River
 Santo Antônio River
 Santa Tereza River
 Cana Brava River
 Morro Alegre River
 Capivara River
 Das Almas River
 Paranã River
 Palma River
 Arraias River
 Palmeiras River
 Mosquito River
 São Domingos River
 Bezerra River
 Mocambo River
 Taíras River

Alphabetically 

 Água Fria River
 Água Fria River
 Das Almas River
 Araguaia River
 Areias River
 Arraias River
 Bagagem River
 Das Balsas River
 Bananal River
 Barreiros River
 Bezerra River
 Bonito River
 Braço Menor do Rio Araguaia River (Javaés River)
 Caiapó River
 Caiapozinho River
 Cana Brava River
 Cana Brava River
 Capivara River
 Capivara River
 Caracol River
 Do Coco River
 Crixás River
 Das Cunhãs River
 Dueré River
 Escuro River
 Espingarda River
 Do Fogo River
 Formiga River
 Formoso River (Cristalino River)
 Fumaça River
 Grotão das Arraias River
 Imuti River
 Jaburu River
 Juari River
 Lajeado River
 Lever River (Itaberaí River)
 Lontra River
 Dos Mangues River
 Manuel Alves da Natividade River
 Manuel Alves Grande River
 Manuel Alves Pequeno River
 Mocambo River
 Morro Alegre River
 Mosquito River
 Muricizal River
 Negro River
 Novo River
 Palma River
 Palmeiras River
 Paranã River
 Pau-Seco River
 Perdida River
 Piaus River
 Piranhas River
 Piranhas River
 Pium River
 Da Prata River
 Riozinho River
 Riozinho River
 Rondi Toró River
 Santa Tereza River
 Santo Antônio River
 São Domingos River
 São Valério River
 Soninho River
 Do Sono River
 Taíras River
 Tiúba River
 Tocantins River
 Urubu Grande River (Das Pedras River)
 Verde River
 Vermelho River
 Vermelho River
 Xavante River

References
 Map from Ministry of Transport
 Rand McNally, The New International Atlas, 1993.
  GEOnet Names Server

 
Toncantins
Environment of Tocantins